Too Early/Too Late is a 1981 essay film directed by Jean-Marie Straub and Danièle Huillet. It is a sequence of shots of rural landscapes accompanied by readings of texts about the struggles of poor farmers, followed by another sequence of shots in Egypt.

References

External links

1981 documentary films
French documentary films
Egyptian documentary films
1980s French films